In the year 2014, Ghana was hit with a scandal in the Police Service involving a top official in the person of DCOP Patrick Timbilla. On 6 March 2014, after the Independence Day parade, it was announced by the police administration that Timbilla has been put under house arrest in light of the allegations leveled against him.

See also 
 Corruption in Ghana

References 

Corruption in Ghana
2014 in Ghana  
2014 crimes in Ghana